Sidney Emilie Morin (born June 6, 1995) is a Canadian-American ice hockey defenseman, currently playing in the Premier Hockey Federation (PHF) with the Minnesota Whitecaps. As a member of the United States women's national team, she won a gold medal in the women's ice hockey tournament at the 2018 Winter Olympics in Sochi.

Playing career 
Morin is a former captain of the Minnesota–Duluth Bulldogs women's ice hockey program. As a Bulldog, Morin was named WCHA Women's Defensive Player of the Year in 2017.

After graduating, she signed her first professional contract with Modo Hockey Dam for the 2017–18 SDHL season. The following season, she signed with Linköping HC Dam. She was named SDHL Defender of the Year in 2020.

International 
She won gold at the 2018 Winter Olympics with Team USA, picking up two assists in five games.

Career statistics

References

External links 
 
 
 

1995 births
Living people
American expatriate ice hockey players in Sweden
American expatriate ice hockey players in Switzerland
American women's ice hockey defensemen
Canadian expatriate ice hockey players in Sweden
Canadian expatriate ice hockey players in Switzerland
HV71 Dam players
Ice hockey players from Minnesota
Ice hockey players at the 2018 Winter Olympics
Linköping HC Dam players
Medalists at the 2018 Winter Olympics
Minnesota Duluth Bulldogs women's ice hockey players
Minnesota Whitecaps players
Modo Hockey Dam players
Olympic gold medalists for the United States in ice hockey
People from Minnetonka, Minnesota
Swiss Women's League players